

Incumbents
 President: Julio Argentino Roca

Governors
 Buenos Aires Province: Bernardo de Irigoyen 
 Cordoba: Donaciano del Campillo  
 Mendoza Province: Jacinto Álvarez

Vice Governors
 Buenos Aires Province: Alfredo Demarchi

Events
January 25 - Plague is officially declared in Rosario. 
January 29–February 4 - Buenos Aires suffers its worst heat wave for 20 years.  In the first two weeks of February, 403 deaths are certified from "heat apoplexy and sunstroke".  The Buenos Aires Herald speculates that some of these are actually caused by plague.
March 30 - By presidential decree, lyrics considered offensive to Spanish immigrants are omitted from future public performances of the Argentine National Anthem. 
May 14–October 28 - Argentina participates for the first time in the Olympic Games.
June 8 - The Argentine Republic is officially declared free of plague.

Births 
April 2 - Roberto Arlt, writer (died 1942)
June 11 - Leopoldo Marechal, writer (died 1970)
August 4 - Arturo Umberto Illia, President of Argentina 1963–66 (died 1983)
October 8 - Alfredo Carricaberry, footballer (died 1942)
December 14 - Juan d'Arienzo, tango musician (died 1976)

See also
1900 in Argentine football

References

 
History of Argentina (1880–1916)
Years of the 19th century in Argentina
Years of the 20th century in Argentina